Paratetramitus is an amoeboid genus of the group Heterolobosea.

References

Percolozoa
Excavata genera